Christophe Agou (1969 – September 2015) was a French documentary photographer and street photographer who lived in New York City. His work has been published in books and is held in public collections. He was a member of the In-Public street photography collective.

Biography
Agou was born in Montbrison, France in 1969. A self-taught photographer, Agou grew up in a small town in the Forez region, on the eastern side of the Massif Central.

From the early 1990s, Agou made documentary-style photographs in both black and white and color which take an allusive approach to the human condition. He also made short films and sculpture. In 1992, he moved to New York City. He began taking photographs in the streets that evoked a sense of longing and isolation. He made photographs at Ground Zero on September 11th, 2001, which were used in numerous publications. He first came to prominence with photographs taken in the New York City Subway, published in his book Life Below (2004).

In 2002 Agou returned to Forez. He traveled to the lesser-known parts of the region and got to know a community of family farmers whose identities are deeply rooted to the land. He photographed and filmed them at work and at home for eight years. This resulted in Face au Silence / In the Face of Silence, a documentary about rural life in early twenty-first century France. The work won him the 2010 European Publishers Award for Photography, and publication in six editions and in six languages.

He became a member of the In-Public street photography collective in 2005.

Agou died in September 2015 of cancer.

Publications

Publications by Agou
Life Below: The New York City Subway. New York: Quantuck Lane Press, 2004. .
Face au Silence. Text by John Berger.
Face au Silence. Arles: Actes Sud, 2010. .
In the Face of Silence. Stockport: Dewi Lewis, 2011. .
Aπέναντι Στη Σιωπή. Apeiron Photos, 2011. .
Ante el Silencio. Barcelona: Lunwerg Editores, 2011. .
Gesichter der Stille. Berlin: Edition Braus, 2011. .
Di Fronte al Silenzio. Rome: Peliti Associati, 2011. .
Les Faits Secondaires. Christophe Agou, 2013. . Texts by Agou and John Berger. Edition of 700 copies.

Publications with contributions by Agou
10 – 10 Years of In-Public. London: Nick Turpin Publishing, 2010. . Includes an essay by Jonathan Glancey, "Outlandish Harmony"; a foreword by Nick Turpin; and a chapter each by Agou, Nick Turpin, David Gibson, Richard Bram, Matt Stuart, Andy Morley-Hall, Trent Parke, Narelle Autio, Jesse Marlow, Adrian Fisk, Nils Jorgensen, Melanie Einzig, Jeffrey Ladd, Amani Willett, Gus Powell, Otto Snoek, Blake Andrews, David Solomons, George Kelly and Paul Russell.
Photographers' Sketchbooks. London: Thames & Hudson, 2014. . Edited by Stephen McLaren and Bryan Formhals.
100 Great Street Photographs. Munich, London, New York: Prestel, 2017. By David Gibson. . Contains a commentary on and a photograph by Agou.

Films

Films by Agou
Face au Silence = In the Face of Silence (2011).

Films with Agou
In-Sight (2011). 38-minute documentary directed and edited by Nick Turpin, commissioned by Format for the Format International Photography Festival, Derby, 2011. Includes interviews with Agou, Richard Bram, Melanie Einzig, David Gibson, Jesse Marlow, Gus Powell, Otto Snoek, David Solomons, and Nick Turpin, and shows them at work.

Exhibitions

Solo exhibitions 
Face au silence. Rencontres d'Arles Festival, Arles, France. 18 November 2011 – 21 January 2012. 
Face au silence. Fait & Cause Galerie, Paris, France. 18 November 2011 – 14 January 2012.
Face au silence.  (MARQ), Clermont-Ferrand, France. 26 January – 29 April 2012.
Face au silence. Galerie Intervalle, Paris, France. 3 September – 11 October 2014.

Group exhibitions 
in-public @ 10, Photofusion, Brixton, London, 28 May – 9 July 2010. Travelled to Les Ballades Photographiques de Seyssel, Seyssel, France, 12–23 July 2011, where it also included the film In-Sight (2011) and The French exhibition by Nick Turpin. Included photographs by In-Public members.
Street Photography Now, Third Floor Gallery, Cardiff, 10 October – 14 November 2010. Photographs from the book Street Photography Now (2011).
2015: The Sharp Eye. In-Public in Mexico, Foto Mexico, Cine Tonalá, Mexico City, Mexico, October–November 2015. Slideshow of photographs.

Awards
1999: Attention Talent Photo Award Fnac
2000: Project Competition - Santa Fe Prize for Photography
2002: Magazine Picture of the Year - Honorable Mention
2002: Ai-AP American Photography Award
2006: W. Eugene Smith Grant in Humanistic Photography - Finalist
2008: Prix de la Photographie de l'Académie des Beaux-Arts de Paris - Finalist
2009: Prix Kodak de la Critique Photographique - Special Mention
2010: European Publishers Award for Photography - Winner
2012: CNC (Centre National du Cinéma et de l'Image Animée). Commission for Sans Adieu.
2013: CNC (Centre National du Cinéma et de l'Image Animée)

Collections 
Agou's work is held in the following public collections:
La Bibliothèque nationale de France, Paris, France
 (MARQ), Clermont-Ferrand, France
Museum of Fine Arts, Houston, TX
Neuberger Museum of Art, Purchase, NY
Smithsonian American Art Museum, Washington, DC
The Akron Art Museum Akron, OH
Southeast Museum of Photography, Daytona, FL
New York Public Library, New York, NY
Frances Lehman Loeb Art Center, Vassar College, Poughkeepsie, NY
New-York Historical Society, New York, NY
Fonds national d'art contemporain (FNAC), Paris, France
The Joy of Giving Something, New York, NY

Notes

References

External links 

 Photoeye

French photographers
Street photographers
1969 births
2015 deaths
Documentary photographers
People from Montbrison, Loire
Deaths from cancer in New York (state)